The 2013 NHK Trophy was the fourth event of six in the 2013–14 ISU Grand Prix of Figure Skating, a senior-level international invitational competition series. It was held at the Yoyogi National Gymnasium in Tokyo on November 8–10. Medals were awarded in the disciplines of men's singles, ladies' singles, pair skating, and ice dancing. Skaters earned points toward qualifying for the 2013–14 Grand Prix Final.

Eligibility
Skaters who reached the age of 14 by July 1, 2013 were eligible to compete on the senior Grand Prix circuit.

Entries
The entries were as follows.

Changes to initial lineup
In the pairs' event, Yuko Kavaguti / Alexander Smirnov withdrew due to an injury to Smirnov. Anastasia Martiusheva / Alexei Rogonov were named as their replacements. In the ladies event, Li Zijun withdrew and was not replaced. In the men's event, Chafik Besseghier withdrew and was not replaced.

Results

Men

Ladies

Pairs

Ice dancing

References

External links
 2013 NHK Trophy

NHK Trophy, 2013
NHK Trophy